The 1965 Bolivian Primera División, the first division of Bolivian football (soccer), was played by 4 teams. The champion was Deportivo Municipal.

La Paz Group

Final Group

External links
 Official website of the LFPB 

Bolivian Primera División seasons
Bolivia
1965 in Bolivian sport